An Ancient Muse is the seventh full-length studio album of the Canadian singer, songwriter, accordionist, harpist, and pianist, Loreena McKennitt. It was released on November 20, 2006, internationally, and November 21, 2006, in the United States and Canada. It was her first studio album after a 9-year gap. It has sold over a half a million copies worldwide since its release.

Overview 

Work on An Ancient Muse started in 2005. According to reports on McKennitt's Quinlan Road website, most of the inspiration for the tracks of the album came from the music of Greece, Turkey, the Middle East and the Far East. Most of the tracks, with the exception of three revealed at the mid-September concerts in the Alhambra of Granada in Spain, were completely unknown until the release.

An Ancient Muse debuted on the U.S. Billboard 200 at number 83, with about 19,000 copies sold in its first week. This was also its peak position on the chart.

Track listing 
All music and lyrics written by Loreena McKennitt except as noted.

 "Incantation" – 2:35
 "The Gates of Istanbul" – 6:59
 "Caravanserai" – 7:36
 "The English Ladye and the Knight" (lyrics by Sir Walter Scott) – 6:49
 "Kecharitomene" – 6:34 
 "Penelope's Song" – 4:21
 "Sacred Shabbat" (Kâtibim arr. Loreena McKennitt) – 3:59
 "Beneath a Phrygian Sky" – 9:32
 "Never-ending Road (Amhrán Duit)" – 5:54

Bonus tracks
 "Raglan Road" – 6:12 – an unreleased track on a bonus disc exclusive to Barnes & Noble
 "Beneath a Phrygian Sky (Gordian version)" – 9:25 – exclusive iTunes Store remix

Personnel 
 Tal Bergman – drums (2, 3), percussion (5, 8)
 Stuart Bruce – vocal drone (1, 8), percussion (5)
 Clive Deamer – drums (8) 
 Panos Dimitrakopoulos – kanoun (2, 3, 5, 7, 9)
 Nigel Eaton – hurdy-gurdy (3, 5)
 Ben Grossman – hurdy-gurdy (5)
 Ed Hanley – tabla (5), udu drum (5)
 Jason Hann – percussion (8)
 Steáfán Hannigan – Turkish clarinet (1, 5, 8), vocal drone (1, 8), uilleann pipes (8, 9)
 Brian Hughes – electric guitar (1, 2, 3, 5, 8, 9), guitar synthesizer (1, 2, 3, 5, 8, 9), vocal drone (1, 8), oud (2, 3, 5), Celtic bouzouki (2, 3, 5, 8), nylon string guitar (5, 8, 9)
 Charlie Jones: acoustic bass (5, 6)
 Manu Katché – drums (5)
 Georgios Kontogiannis – Greek bouzouki (2, 3)
 Tim Landers – bass (2, 3, 8)
 Caroline Lavelle – cello (2, 3, 5, 6, 7, 8, 9)
 Rick Lazar – percussion (1, 5, 8)
 Annbjørg Lien – nyckelharpa (6)
 Hugh Marsh – violin (3, 5, 6)
 Loreena McKennitt – vocals (1, 2, 3, 4, 6, 8, 9), keyboards (1, 2, 3, 4, 5, 6, 7, 8, 9), accordion (3), harp (4), percussion (5), piano (8)
 Marco Migliari – vocal drone (1, 8)
 Donald Quan – viola (1, 2, 3, 5, 6, 8, 9), vocal drone (1, 8)
  Hossam Ramzy – percussion (2, 5)
 Sokratis Sinopoulos – lyra (2, 3, 7, 8)
 Haig Yazdjian – oud (2, 3, 5, 6, 7)
 Choristers of Westminster Abbey; Alex Pott, Elliot Thompson and Nicholas Morris – vocals (4)

Chart performance

Certifications

References 

Loreena McKennitt albums
2006 albums